Kaech'ŏn or Kaechon (Hangul: ,) is a city in South P'yŏngan province, North Korea.

Geography
The Myohyangsan, Changansan, Ch'ŏnsŏngsan, and Ch'ŏngryongsan mountain ranges come together in Kaech'ŏn.  The highest peak is Paekt'apsan.  The most important rivers are the Ch'ŏngch'ŏn River and the Taedong River.  The area of the city is 61% forested.

Administrative divisions
Kaech'ŏn-si is divided into 26 tong (neighbourhoods) and 11 ri (villages):

Economy
Water resources are abundant, and several reservoirs are located in Kaech'ŏn.

Agriculture has been extensively developed, including livestock and fruit orchards.  Machining and metalworking are the dominant industries,  mining has also become more prominent.

Transportation
Kaech'ŏn is served by the Korean State Railway's Kaech'ŏn Line and the Manp'o Line trunk lines, as well as the Choyang Colliery Line and Chunhyŏk Line secondary lines.

Tourism
Tourist sites in Kaech'ŏn include Songam Cavern, Taeripsa Temple with its 9-level stone pagoda, the fortresses of Changhamsŏng, T'osŏng, and Kosasansŏng, Namsa dolmen, and the group of dolments at Mukpangsan.  There are also Yŏnpung Lake, which was constructed in 1956, and Yongwŏn Cavern, which was discovered in 1966 and is preserved as North Korea's Natural Monument No. 43.

The Kaechon Revolutionary Site is associated with Kim Il-sung's 250 Mile Journey for National Liberation. A statue was erected there on the occasion of the Day of the Sun, April 15, in 2001.

Prison camps
There are two large prison camps in Kaech'ŏn, both known for very harsh conditions:
Shin Dong-hyuk was born in the camp, tortured there, and finally saw his mother and brother executed before he escaped.
Lee Soon-ok was imprisoned for six years in the camp and gave testimony before the United States Senate.

See also

List of cities in North Korea
Transportation in North Korea

Notes

Further reading
Dormels, Rainer. North Korea's Cities: Industrial facilities, internal structures and typification. Jimoondang, 2014.

External links

City profile of Kaechon 

 
Cities in South Pyongan